A number of motor vessels have been named Nicola, including:

, a Canadian ferry

Ship names